Fallout from the Phil Zone is a double compilation album of live recordings by the Grateful Dead handpicked by the band's bassist Phil Lesh. It contains the first Grateful Dead CD releases of "In the Midnight Hour" (clocking in at over 30 minutes) and Bob Dylan's "Visions of Johanna".

The album title has multiple meanings. Since the performances were selected by Phil, they are the ones in his "zone". It also refers to the so-called "Phil Zone", an area directly in front of the bass amps onstage where some fans would stand, feeling the full-impact of the vibrations of Lesh's bass-playing. Lastly, it is a reference to the TV series The Twilight Zone. Lesh stated that, in addition to selecting personal favorites, he wanted to compile rarer material that may not have been released as part of a complete concert.

Content

The album includes a 30+ minute version of "In The Midnight Hour". Lesh said that he picked it because someone accused them of playing it for 45 minutes. He then tried to find the longest version. The album also includes "Hard To Handle" from an audience tape of the 8/6/71 concert. The audience recording was chosen because of the high quality.

Track listing

Personnel
Jerry Garcia – lead guitar, vocals
Bob Weir – rhythm guitar, vocals
Phil Lesh – bass guitar, vocals
Bill Kreutzmann – drums
Mickey Hart – drums (except disc 1, track 6 and disc 2, track 3)
Ron "Pigpen" McKernan – harmonica, organ, vocals (disc 1, tracks 1–2, 4 and 6 and disc 2, track 3)
Tom Constanten – organ (disc 1, tracks 3 and 5)
Brent Mydland – keyboards, vocals (disc 2, tracks 1 and 5)
Keith Godchaux – piano (disc 2, track 2)
Vince Welnick – keyboards (disc 2, track 4)

Production
 Phil Lesh – producer, liner notes
John Cutler – producer 
Dick Latvala – tape archivist
Jeffrey Norman – engineer
Joe Gastwirt – mastering
Alan Trist – publisher
Shawn Kennedy – cover art
Rob Cohn – photography
Amy Finkle – package design

Charts
Album – Billboard

References 

Grateful Dead live albums
1997 live albums
Albums produced by Phil Lesh
Grateful Dead Records live albums